Vilmos Kondor (born 1954) is the name (possibly pseudonym) of a successful Hungarian author. His seven crime novels, known as the Sinful Budapest Cycle, depict the adventures of a journalist, Zsigmond Gordon, in Budapest from the 1930s to the 1950s. They have become very popular in Hungary. He's been dubbed as "the creator of Hungarian crime fiction".

Biography

Personal life
Kondor attended university in Szeged, then continued his studies in Paris. He graduated in chemical engineering from the Sorbonne, then returned to Hungary. Currently he teaches mathematics and physics at a high school. He lives with his wife, daughters and dog in a small village near Sopron. He leads a quiet life and, if he gives interviews at all, he does so only by email.

Professional life
Kondor worked for three years on his first published novel, Budapest Noir. It was his fourth finished manuscript. Kondor finished the Budapest Noir series with the fifth novel, Budapest novemberben (Budapest in November), published in June 2012.

As influences, Kondor has mentioned Jim Thompson, Charles Willeford and Dashiell Hammett, and he based one of his characters, Vörös Margó (Red Margot) on the character Dinah Brand in Hammett's novel Red Harvest.

Works
The core five novels of the cycle are as follows:

Budapest Noir
A Jewish girl is found dead in Budapest in 1936, and, Zsigmond Gordon, a determined crime reporter, sets out to solve a murder that everyone else in his soon-to-be Fascist country wants to leave buried.

Budapest Noir received a warm reception in Hungary, and many reviewers hailed it as the first true hardboiled crime story written in Hungarian. One critic, Péter I. Rácz, welcomed Kondor as the author of the first Hungarian crime thriller. 
"The search [for a Hungarian crime thriller] is at an end: Vilmos Kondor’s novel is a Hungarian crime thriller and then some, one of the harder variety, in the spirit of Chandler and Hammett, but with Hungarian characters and set in the Hungarian capital in the period before World War II. ... Kondor’s literary experiment has been a great success: the Hungarian hard-boiled crime thriller has been born, and, far predating its own period, it leads its readers – with an effect that 'carries into the present' – to the literary realm of the 1930s." ÉS.

The novel was adapted to a movie of the same title. It premiered 2 November 2017, and is currently available on almost all online platforms.

Bűnös Budapest (Sinful Budapest)
The sequel to Budapest Noir was published in June 2009 by Agave Könyvek. The story is set in the fall of 1939, a couple of weeks after the outbreak of World War II. and features Zsigmond Gordon and Sándor Nemes, a retired detective. They start investigating two different cases: Gordon wants to find out why a former colleague and friend has died, while Nemes is hired to find out what happened to a huge quantity of cocaine and morphine that has gone missing. The two cases merge, and the solution involves politicians, Hungarian Nazis and corrupt policemen. 
One reviewer, Péter Urfi, wrote about the "Kondor phenomenon":
“In the Hungarian book market, developments as joyful as the Kondor phenomenon are rare. Kondor is a professional genre author: he knows exactly what a hard-boiled crime novel should be like, and how to write one. His protagonist, the resigned crime reporter Zsigmond Gordon, and his chosen time and place, Budapest in the 1930s, are both complex and mysterious enough for a series to be built around them, with the same characters and the same readers, for whom the slightly more lengthy Budapest Sin will not be a disappointment.” Magyar Narancs

A budapesti kém (The Budapest Spy)
Hungary is about to get drawn into World War II when Zsigmond Gordon is asked to do something important for his country, and sets out to catch a deadly spy in war-torn Europe, only to find the traitor in Budapest in 1943.

A critic called the novel a "time machine".

"All those who have never daydreamed about travelling back in time with a time machine to change the course of certain events, raise your hand. If any of you wish to relive Hungary as it was in the 1940s, then by all means pick up Vilmos Kondor’s latest novel, which not only reveals practical espionage facts, but also depicts the operation and circumstances reigning within the secret services of a country being driven into war."

Budapest romokban (Budapest in Ruins)
After the horrors of World War II, Hungary is about to become a democracy, but in the summer of 1946 an assassin strikes in the middle of Budapest, and the consequences are more dire than anyone would dare to think. Gordon starts to investigate the real culprits, who turn out to be, not the criminal lords of the capital, but ruthless Soviet officers and their even more ruthless masters.

A reviewer emphasized that Kondor writes about a kind of freedom that has not been common in Hungary:
“Without Vilmos Kondor’s work the acts of the man socialized for freedom (with all it consequences) couldn’t be studied in Hungarian texts.”

Budapest novemberben (Budapest in November)
October 1956 finds Gordon in exile in Vienna, where he is asked to identify a dead body as his adopted daughter. Even though the girl turns out to be someone else, Gordon – along with Krisztina – hops on the last train to Budapest, where a revolution has just started, tanks are rolling onto the streets, and people are dying by the hundreds. But Gordon is interested only in finding his daughter, and the dangerous killer who tries to stay hidden while chaos ensues on the streets of a city that is fighting for its independence and freedom.

A reviewer welcomed the way Kondor handles history in this final novel in the Budapest Noir series:
"Kondor doesn't only paint a picture and doesn't only repeat what is in the history books: he tries to interpret it, make sense of it, and help us understand the relations and dynamics of this hectic era."

Short stories
Kondor's collection of short stories was published in 2018 under the title 'A haldokló részvényes.'

Interpretations
Kondor's work has been present in the Hungarian media in several forms. His novels and short stories have been turned into audiobooks, radio plays, comics and even photo exhibitions.

Other Works
Kondor wrote a trilogy of thrillers about the fictional Wertheimer family's almost century long affiliation with the Holy Crown of Hungary, and a trilogy of contemporary police procedurals with strong political overtones. He also published a short novel under the title 'Az otthontalanság otthona' whose whole income he donated to an NGO that gave a helping hand to the migrants who arrived to Hungary during the crisis in 2015.

Style and method

Kondor always uses a third-person narrative that is arguably a masked first-person narrative, since the reader always sees what the protagonist(s) see. The narrator is also an historical figure who knows only the time frame of the novel and never steps out of it. Kondor thus views events through the eyes of his protagonists, and rarely comments on the political situation. He follows in the steps of Charles Willeford in the sense that his characters never "think", they only "act": there are no inner monologues.

Kondor mixes fictional characters with persons from real life, including Leó Vécsey (journalist), Kornél Tábori (journalist), Tibor Ferenczy (police commissioner), Péter Hain (detective), Tibor Wayand (detective), István Bárczy (chief of staff), and Vilmos Tarján (journalist). He thoroughly researches people and events in order to invoke the atmosphere of Hungary, and especially Budapest, in the 1930s, 1940s and 1950s.

Foreign Editions
The core five novels of the series were published in Finnish by Tammi. So far, Budapest Noir has been published in English, in German, in Italian, in French, in Polish, in Dutch, in Russian, in Estonian, in Bulgarian, in Greek, in Czech and in Slovenian.

References

External links
The official website of Budapest Noir
János Pelle's review of Budapest Noir in Hungarian on hvg.hu
Péter I. Rácz's review of Budapest Noir in Hungarian in ÉS
Krisztina Horeczky's review of Budapest Noir in Hungarian in Népszabadság
Krisztián Benyovszky's review of Budapest Noir in Hungarian in Új Szó in Bratislava
Gábor Wágner's review of Budapest Noir in Hungarian in Pesti Műsor
István M. Szabó's review of Budapest Noir in Hungarian in Magyar Narancs
Tibor Bárány's review of Budapest Noir in Hungarian in Magyar Narancs
puskar's review of Budapest Noir in Hungarian on index.hu
Janos Horváth's review of Budapest Noir in Hungarian on Dark Corners
Sándor Tóth's review of Budapest Noir in Hungarian in Zsaru Magazin
All the available reviews on Budapest Noir in English
Interview with Kondor in Exit in Hungarian

1954 births
Hungarian writers
Living people
Crime fiction writers